Parliamentary elections were held in Norway in 1865. As political parties were not officially established until 1884, all those elected were independents. The number of seats in the Storting remained at 111, the first time it had been unchanged since 1823. Voter turnout was 41.8%, although only 4.8% of the country's population was eligible to vote.

Results

References

General elections in Norway
19th-century elections in Norway
Norway
Parliamentary